Domat may refer to:

Domat/Ems, a municipality of the canton of Graubünden, Switzerland
Jean Domat
Domat (olive), a Turkish olive see Olive#Cultivars
Domatic number
Domats is a commune of the Yonne département, in France